Oldevatnet is a lake in the municipality of Stryn in Vestland county, Norway. It is located in the valley of Oldedalen. The river of Oldeelva flows from Oldevatnet via the lake of Floen to Innvikfjorden, a branch of Nordfjord.

See also
List of lakes in Norway

References

Stryn
Lakes of Vestland